The 1998 Nordic Tournament was the second edition and took place in Lahti, Falun, Trondheim and Oslo between 7–15 March 1998.

Results

Overall

References

External links
Official website 

1998 in ski jumping
Nordic Tournament